The Roselle Park School District is a comprehensive community public school district that serves students in kindergarten through twelfth grade from Roselle Park, in Union County, New Jersey, United States.

As of the 2018–19 school year, the district, comprising five schools, had an enrollment of 2,034 students and 174.8 classroom teachers (on an FTE basis), for a student–teacher ratio of 11.6:1.

The district is classified by the New Jersey Department of Education as being in District Factor Group "DE", the fifth-highest of eight groupings. District Factor Groups organize districts statewide to allow comparison by common socioeconomic characteristics of the local districts. From lowest socioeconomic status to highest, the categories are A, B, CD, DE, FG, GH, I and J.

Schools
Schools in the district (with 2018–19 enrollment data from the National Center for Education Statistics) are:
Elementary schools
Aldene Elementary School with 286 students in grades PreK-5
Sloan Scully, Principal

Robert Gordon Elementary School with 266 students in grades PreK-5
Elise Genao, Principal
Sherman Elementary School with 355 students in grades K-5
Tara Lechner, Principal
Middle school
Roselle Park Middle School with 526 students in grades 6-8
Patricia Gois, Principal
High school
Roselle Park High School with 587 students in grades 9-12
Sarah Costa, Principal

Administration
Core members of the district's administration are:
Pedro Garrido, Superintendent
Michelle Calas, Business Administrator / Board Secretary

Board of education
The district's board of education, with nine members, sets policy and oversees the fiscal and educational operation of the district through its administration. As a Type II school district, the board's trustees are elected directly by voters to serve three-year terms of office on a staggered basis, with three seats up for election each year held (since 2012) as part of the November general election.

References

External links
Roselle Park School District

School Data for the Roselle Park School District, National Center for Education Statistics

Roselle Park, New Jersey
New Jersey District Factor Group DE
School districts in Union County, New Jersey